Deborah Glass  (born 1959) is an Australian lawyer, who has been the Victorian Ombudsman since March 2014.

A lawyer by profession, she spent her formative years in Melbourne, Australia, before taking her career overseas to Switzerland, Hong Kong, and the United Kingdom. From 2008 to 2014, Glass was the deputy chair of the Independent Police Complaints Commission (IPCC) in the United Kingdom.  She was also one of the IPCC's ten operational Commissioners, in which capacity she had joint regional responsibility for London and the South-East.

Early years
Glass was born in 1959 in Bega, New South Wales, and raised in Melbourne. She attended Mount Scopus Memorial College and then Monash University, where she obtained her BA in 1980 and LLB in 1982.

Career
Glass practiced law briefly in Melbourne, before relocating to Switzerland in 1985 to work for Citicorp, a US Investment Bank. In 1989 she was appointed to the Hong Kong Securities and Futures Commission, where she became Senior Director and was instrumental in raising standards in the investment management industry. She then moved to London in 1998 where she became Chief Executive of the Investment Management Regulatory Organisation, which under her stewardship was successfully subsumed into the London-based Financial Services Authority. She also worked as an Independent custody visitor between 1999 and 2005. In 2001, Glass was appointed to the Police Complaints Authority, and in 2004 became a Commissioner with the  Independent Police Complaints Commission (IPCC). She was the Commissioner responsible, among other things, for London, and for many high-profile criminal and misconduct investigations and decisions involving the police. These included decisions in relation to the police response to the News International phone hacking scandal phone-hacking affair, the death of Ian Tomlinson during the London G20 protests in 2009, the decision to launch an independent investigation into the aftermath of the Hillsborough disaster, and the Plebgate affair. In 2012 Glass was awarded an Order of the British Empire for her service. She left the IPCC in March 2014, having completed a 10-year term with the organisation, which then published her personal critique of the police complaints system in England and Wales. Glass returned to Australia in 2014 and was appointed by the state government as Ombudsman Victoria for a 10-year fixed term.  Glass was awarded Monash University Faculty of Law's Distinguished Alumni Award in 2016.

Publications
Some of Glass's key investigations as Victorian Ombudsman have been:

 Investigation into Department of Health oversight of Mentone Gardens, a Supported Residential Service (April 2015)
 Investigation into the rehabilitation and reintegration of prisoners in Victoria (September 2015)
 Investigation into public transport fare evasion enforcement (May 2016)
 Investigation into the management of complex workers compensation claims and WorkSafe oversight (September 2016) 
 Investigation into the transparency of local government decision making (December 2016)
 Investigation into the management of maintenance claims against public housing tenants (October 2017)
 Implementing OPCAT in Victoria: report and inspection of the Dame Phyllis Frost Centre (November 2017)
 Investigation into the financial support provided to kinship carers (December 2017)
 Investigation of a matter referred from the Legislative Council on 25 November 2015 (March 2018)
 Investigation into child sex offender Robert Whitehead's involvement with Puffing Billy and other railway bodies (June 2018)
 OPCAT in Victoria: A thematic investigation of practices related to solitary confinement of children and young people (September 2019) 
 WorkSafe2: Follow-up investigation into the management of complex workers compensation claims (December 2019)
 Investigation into review of parking fines by the City of Melbourne (September 2020) 
 Investigation into the detention and treatment of public housing residents arising from a COVID-19 'hard lockdown' in July 2020 (December 2020)
 Investigation into the Department of Jobs, Precincts and Regions’ administration of the Business Support Fund (April 2021)
 Investigation into how local councils respond to ratepayers in financial hardship (May 2021) 
 Investigation into decision-making under the Victorian Border Crossing Permit Directions (December 2021) 
 Investigation of a matter referred from the Legislative Council on 9 February 2022  Part 1 (July 2022) 
 Operation Watts, a joint investigation into allegations of serious corrupt conduct involving Victorian public officers, including Members of Parliament

References

External links
 Official Victorian Ombudsman Website
 About the Victorian Ombudsman 
 Power To The People - The Age
 Australian Women Lawyers as Active Citizens - Deborah Glass
 Monash Alumni Stories - Deborah Glass 

1959 births
Living people
20th-century Australian lawyers
Monash University alumni
Ombudsmen in Australia
Lawyers from Melbourne
Public servants from Melbourne
Australian Jews
Australian Officers of the Order of the British Empire
21st-century Australian lawyers